Musée National de l’Automobile, Collection Schlumpf is an automobile museum located in Mulhouse, France, and built around the Schlumpf Collection of classic automobiles. It has the largest displayed collection of automobiles and contains the largest and most comprehensive collection of Bugatti motor vehicles in the world.

History
Brothers Hans and Fritz Schlumpf were Swiss citizens born in Italy, but after their mother Jeanne was widowed, she moved the family to her home town of Mulhouse in Alsace, France. The two brothers, who were later described as having a "Schlumpf obsession", were devoted to their mother.

In 1935 the Schlumpf brothers founded a limited company which focused on producing spun woollen products. By 1940, at the time of the German invasion of France, 34-year-old Fritz was the chairman of a spinning mill in Malmerspach. After World War II, the two brothers devoted their time to obsessively growing their business, and became wealthy.

Obsessive secrecy

Fritz loved cars, driven by an abiding love for beautiful automotive engineering. Having wanted a Bugatti since childhood, he bought a Bugatti Type 35B just before the German invasion of France.

After the war he began racing classic cars, but was requested by the textile union to "abstain from this competition which could endanger your life and deprive us of our esteemed director." Schlumpf had been generous to his workers, providing employee trips, installing an employee theater and driving expectant mothers to the hospital in his own car. This was in great contrast to brother Hans, a former banker, who paid the mill workers poorly, docked fifteen minutes off their pay if they were late or signed out a minute or two early, and did not pay bonuses or increments.

With postwar modern 1950s car designs coming on stream, people wanted to exchange their classic 1920s through 1930s cars in for new models. Fritz and Hans began collecting in earnest in the early 1950s, developing a reputation in the trade for only buying the most desirable models. Assisted by Mr Raffaelli, a Renault dealer from Marseilles and the owner of several Bugattis, they built a Bugatti collection obsessively and quickly:
During the summer of 1960, they acquired ten Bugattis, including two Type 57s and one Type 46 5-litre model. In addition the pair found three Rolls-Royces, two Hispano-Suizas and one Tatra. By the end of the summer, they had purchased 40 cars.
Gordini sold them ten old racing cars in one sale
Ferrari sold a racing single seater
Mercedes-Benz sold spare cars from its collection
Racing driver Jo Siffert sold three Lotus racing cars

While an enormous variety of marques is represented in the collection, it is now clear that the primary focus of the Schlumpf brothers was Bugatti. Fritz sent a form letter to all Bugatti owners on the club register, offering to buy all of their cars. In 1962 he bought nearly 50 Bugattis. In the spring of 1963, he acquired 18 of Ettore Bugatti's personal cars, including the Bugatti Royale Coupé Napoléon. In 1963 collector John Shakespeare of Centralia, Illinois, (oil developer, and heir to the Shakespeare fishing reel fortune), offered his collection of 30 Bugattis (then the largest collection in the US), and Fritz bought all of them. They were shipped from Hoffman, Illinois by the Southern Railroad to New Orleans, then by freighter to Le Havre, making headlines in the US. By 1967 an inventory showed 105 Bugattis in the brothers' Schlumpf collection.

Mulhouse
Over the years nearly 400 items (vehicles, chassis and engines) were acquired, and from 1964 as the woollen industry started to downturn, a wing of the former  Mulhouse spinning mill was chosen to quietly restore and house the collection.

A team of up to 40 carpenters, saddlers, and master mechanics was assembled to carry out the restoration work, who under a confidentiality agreement kept their work and the scale of the collection a secret - a singlemindedness often referred to as "The Schlumpf Obsession." Many, including members of Bugatti clubs around the world, knew of the collection. The scale of the enterprise surprised almost everybody.

Fritz visited Mulhouse daily, choosing the colors and type of restoration each car would receive. The workers removed the mill's interior walls and laid a red tile walkway with gravel floors for the cars to rest upon. The brothers Schlumpf remained very secretive about their car collection, only rarely showing it to a favored few.

The Schlumpf affair
In light of the unrelenting global shift of textile manufacturing to Asia, by 1976 the Schlumpf brothers began selling their factories. In October the Malmerspach plant laid off employees, and a strike broke out, with 400 police holding back the workers from ransacking the Mulhouse plant. After a stand-off, on March 7, 1977, textile-union activists staged a sit-in strike at Schlumpf offices, and broke into the Mulhouse "factory"  to find the astounding collection of cars. An unrestored Austin 7 was burned and the workers' union representative remarked "There are 600 more where this one came from."

The Schlumpfs fled to their native Switzerland, and spent the rest of their days as permanent residents of the Drei Koenige Hotel in Basel. But with wages and tax evasion accusations outstanding, the factory was occupied the next two years by the textile-union and renamed "Workers’ Factory." To recoup some lost wages, the union opened the museum to the public, with some 800,000 people viewing the collection in two years.

As the scale of the brothers Schlumpf debt rose, various creditors, including the French government and unions, eyed the car collection toward recovering their losses. To save the collection from destruction, break-up or export, the contents were classified in 1978 as a French Historic Monument by Council of State. In 1979, a bankruptcy liquidator ordered the building closed.

National Automobile Museum Association

In 1981 the collection, buildings and residual land were sold to the National Automobile Museum Association (NAMAoM), a state sanctioned public/private conglomerate that includes: the City of Mulhouse, the Regional Board of the Alsace Region, the organizers of the Paris Auto Show and the Automobile Club de France.

The NAMAoM placed daily management of the museum in the hands of an operating company, the National Automobile Museum of Mulhouse Management Association, which opened the museum to the public in 1982. However, lacking the enthusiasm of the Schlumpfs or the financial drive of the union, the collection gradually fell into decline.

In 1999 NAMAoM contracted Culturespaces to take over and modernise the museum and its operations. Culturespaces renovated the museum, including creating large scale public spaces for other cultural events, while conserving the well-known main hall with its Pont Alexandre III lamp posts. Widening the relevance of the museum to a younger audience by being given control of the French national automobile collection, the museum reopened in March 2000 as the largest automobile museum in the world.

Malmerspach collection
In 1981, Fritz Schlumpf filed a lawsuit from Switzerland claiming he was entitled to a portion of the proceeds of the sale to NAMAoM. He died in 1992, but in 1999 a French court found in his favor, and directed that the French Government pay the balance of a 40 million franc indemnity to Schlumpf's widow Madame Arlette Schlumpf-Naas in Switzerland. The court also instructed return of the ownership of the 62 cars in the so-called "Malmerspach collection" (the reserve stock), including 17 Bugattis - 8 from the collection of John Shakespeare.

Having moved the cars to a shed in Wettolsheim, Madame Schlumpf-Naas drew up a commercial agreement with businessmen Jaap Braam Ruben and Bruno Vendiesse, which meant that she sold the cars to them, but that they would remain in the storage shed until after her death. After Madame Schlumpf-Naas died on 16 May 2008 at the age of 78, many of the cars were sold to the Peter W. Mullin collection, to be displayed at the Mullin Automotive Museum in Oxnard, California (formerly housing the Chandler Vintage Museum of Transportation and Wildlife).

The museum today
The museum is now listed as a National Heritage site by the French Government. The museum is still dedicated to the Schlumpf brothers' mother Jeanne Schlumpf; there is a large shrine to her at the entrance to the museum.

The collection includes over 520 vehicles, with 400 displayed in three main sections in chronological order:

The Motorcar Experience
Motor Racing - including a grid of Type 35 Bugattis, plus Maserati 250Fs, Mercedes-Benz W125 and W154 pre-war Grand Prix cars and a hoard of light blue Gordinis
Motorcar Masterpieces

The museum houses three Type 41 "Royale"s: two of the original six Royales plus a replica of the Esder Royale created at the Schlumpf brothers' workshops from genuine Bugatti spare parts.

Few of the cars on display are in running order, although the old Schlumpf restoration shop, abandoned after they fled in 1977, is being revived to begin working again on the museum's cars.

At the entrance, visitors are given free of charge an audioguide in their chosen language. The tour has been enhanced by new sections, films, driving simulators, robots and attractions such as sound programmes.

The collection
1 ABC (British), 8 Alfa Romeo, 4 Amilcar, 2 Arzens, 1 Aster, 1 Aston Martin, 1 Audi, 1 Austro-Daimler, 3 Ballot, 1 Bardon, 1 Barraco, 2 Barré, 1 Baudier, 4 Bentley, 8 Benz, 1 B.N.C, 1 Bollée, 1 Brasier, 123 Bugatti, 1 Charron, 1 Chrysler, 1 Cisitalia, 10 Citroën, 1 Clément de Dion, 2 Clément-Bayard, 1 Clément-Panhard, 1 Corre La Licorne, 6 Daimler, 4 Darracq, 1 Decauville, 1 De Dietrich, 29 De Dion-Bouton, 3 Delage, 4 Delahaye, 2 Delaunay-Belleville, 1 Dufaux, 1 Ensais, 1 Esculape, 2 Farman, 13 Ferrari, 4 Fiat, 3 Ford, 1 Fouillaron, 3 Georges Richard, 1 Gladiator, 11 Gordini, 7 Hispano-Suiza, 3 Horch, 2 Horlacher, 1 Hotchkiss et Cie, 2 Hotchkiss-Gregoire, 1 Jaquot (Dampfwagen), 3 Le Zèbre, 1 Lorraine-Dietrich,  4 Lotus, 1 M.A.F., 8 Maserati, 2 Mathis, 1 Maurer-Union, 7 Maybach, 1 McLaren-Peugeot, 1 Menier,  9 Mercedes, 22 Mercedes-Benz, 2 Minerva, 2 Monet-Goyon, 2 Mors, 1 Moto-Peugeot, 2 Neracar, 1 O.M., 19 Panhard & Levassor, 1 Pegaso, 29 Peugeot, 1 Philos, 1 Piccard-Pictet, 3 Piccolo, 2 Pilain, 6 Porsche, 1 Ravel, 18 Renault, 1 Rheda, 1 Richard-Brasier, 1 Ripert, 1 Rochet-Schneider, 14 Rolls-Royce, 1 Sage, 1 Salmson, 1 Scott, 1 Sénéchal,  5 Serpollet, 3 Simca-Gordini, 1 Sizaire-Naudin, 1 Soncin, 1 SS, 1 Steyr, 2 Talbot, 1 Tatra, 1 Toyota, 1 Trabant, 1 Turicum, 1 Vaillante, 7 Vélo, 1 Vélo-Goldschmitt, 1 Vélo-Peugeot, 1 Vermotel, 1 Violet-Bogey, 3 Voisin, 1 Volkswagen, 2 Zedel

Gallery

References

Notes

Bibliography

External links

Official website for the museum - English language version
Motoring journal writeup on the Museum

Automobile museums in France
Buildings and structures in Mulhouse
Museums in Haut-Rhin
Monuments historiques of Haut-Rhin
Museums established in 1978